Pochinok is a town and the administrative center of Pochinkovsky District in Smolensk Oblast, Russia, located on the Khmara River (Dnieper's basin)  southeast of Smolensk, the administrative center of the oblast. Population:

Climate
Pochinok has a warm-summer humid continental climate (Dfb in the Köppen climate classification).

<div style="width:70%;">

History
Pochinok has been known since 1811 as a village. It belonged to Yelninsky Uyezd of Smolensk Governorate. In 1926, it was granted a town status. In October 1928, Yelninsky Uyezd was abolished and split between Smolensky, Roslavlsky, and Vyazemsky Uyezds. Pochinok was transferred to Smolensky Uyezd.

On 12 July 1929, governorates and uyezds were abolished, and Pochinkovsky District with the administrative center in the town of Pochinok was established. The district belonged to Roslavl Okrug of Western Oblast. On August 1, 1930 the okrugs were abolished, and the districts were subordinated directly to the oblast. On 27 September 1937 Western Oblast was abolished and split between Oryol and Smolensk Oblasts. Pochinkovsky District was transferred to Smolensk Oblast. Between 1941 and 1943, during WWII, the town was occupied by German troops.

Administrative and municipal status
Within the framework of administrative divisions, Pochinok serves as the administrative center of Pochinkovsky District. As an administrative division, it is incorporated within Pochinkovsky District as Pochinkovskoye Urban Settlement. As a municipal division, this administrative unit also has urban settlement status and is a part of Pochinkovsky Municipal District.

Economy

Industry
There are enterprises of textile and food industries in Pochinok.

Transportation

A railway connecting Smolensk and Bryansk goes through Pochinok. Pochinok is the main railway station within Pochinkovsky district.

The R120 road (formerly A141), which connects Smolensk with Bryansk and Oryol, passes close to Pochinok. There is a road between Pochinok and Yelnya, as well as another one across the border to Mstsislaw where it continues to Orsha and Krychaw. There are also local roads with bus traffic originating from Pochinok.

Military
Since the Cold War, nearby Shatalovo air base has been a major training and operations facility for Soviet and Russian Air Force combat crews.

Culture and recreation
In Pochinok, there is a local museum which was opened in 2000. The expositions highlight history of the district.

Notable people
The most famous native of Pochinok is the artist and designer El Lissitzky.

References

Notes

Sources

Cities and towns in Smolensk Oblast
Yelninsky Uyezd